Bulhoek Pass, (English: Bull Corner), is situated in the Eastern Cape, province of South Africa near Steynsburg.

Mountain passes of the Eastern Cape